Georgi Mshvenieradze (born 12 August 1960, in Tbilisi, Georgian SSR) is a Soviet water polo player. His father, Petre, was the captain of the USSR team throughout the 1950s and appeared at three Olympic Games. Georgy and his brother Nugzari followed their father into the sport.

See also
 Soviet Union men's Olympic water polo team records and statistics
 List of Olympic champions in men's water polo
 List of Olympic medalists in water polo (men)
 List of world champions in men's water polo
 List of World Aquatics Championships medalists in water polo

References

External links
 

1960 births
Living people
Male water polo players from Georgia (country)
Olympic water polo players of the Soviet Union
Water polo players at the 1980 Summer Olympics
Water polo players at the 1988 Summer Olympics
Olympic gold medalists for the Soviet Union
Olympic bronze medalists for the Soviet Union
Olympic medalists in water polo
Sportspeople from Tbilisi
Medalists at the 1988 Summer Olympics
Medalists at the 1980 Summer Olympics